John Jeffrey Finley (born April 14, 1967) is a Canadian former professional ice hockey player. In 708 career games in the National Hockey League, Finley scored 13 goals and 70 assists for 83 points.

Career
Finley was drafted by the New York Islanders in the third round, 55th overall in the 1985 NHL Draft. He made his debut with the Islanders during 1987–1988 season, where he scored 5 assists in 10 games. Finley would bounce between the Islanders and the minors until the 1993–1994 season. In the next four years he would play with the Philadelphia Flyers, Winnipeg Jets, Phoenix Coyotes, and New York Rangers, along with a number of minor league affiliates.

Finley finally got the break he needed when he was traded to the St. Louis Blues during the 1998–1999 season. Under coach Joel Quenneville he earned a spot on the Blues roster as a defensive specialist and remained there until the 2003–2004 season. For the 2005–2006 season Finley played overseas in Germany for the Hannover Scorpions before retiring and moving to Kelowna, British Columbia. He then joined the Kelowna Rockets of the Western Hockey League (WHL) as their assistant coach, leading them to the 2009 Memorial Cup, before leaving in September 2009.

Personal life
His son Jack plays for the Winnipeg Ice in the WHL and was drafted by the Tampa Bay Lightning in the 2020 NHL Entry Draft.

Career statistics

Regular season and playoffs

References

External links
 

1967 births
Living people
Canadian ice hockey defencemen
Capital District Islanders players
Detroit Red Wings scouts
Hannover Scorpions players
Hartford Wolf Pack players
Hershey Bears players
Phoenix Coyotes players
Philadelphia Flyers players
Portland Winterhawks players
New York Islanders draft picks
New York Islanders players
New York Rangers players
St. Louis Blues players
Ice hockey people from Edmonton
Springfield Falcons players
Springfield Indians players
Winnipeg Jets (1979–1996) players
Canadian expatriate ice hockey players in Germany